Ilmar Öpik (17 June 1917 Tallinn – 29 July 2001) was an Estonian energetics scientist, academician.

In 1940 he graduated from Tallinn University of Technology as an engineer-mechanic. In 1963 he defended his doctoral thesis at Moscow Energetics Institute. Since 1946 he taught at Tallinn Polytechnical Institute.

Since 1967 he became a member of Estonian Academy of Sciences. 1977-1978 he was the vice-president of the academy. 1984-1996 he was the chief editor of the journal Oil Shale.

Much of his research was related to oil shale.

Awards:
 1996: Order of the National Coat of Arms, III class.

References

1917 births
2001 deaths
Estonian scientists
Oil shale researchers
Academic staff of the Tallinn University of Technology
Recipients of the Order of the National Coat of Arms, 3rd Class
Tallinn University of Technology alumni
Burials at Metsakalmistu
Oil shale in Estonia